Mage: The Sorcerers Crusade is a tabletop role-playing game published by White Wolf Publishing in 1998. It is part of the World of Darkness series, and is a spin-off from Mage: The Ascension. Set during the Renaissance, it depicts the beginning of the struggle between "traditionalists" and "technocrats".

History
White Wolf Publishing came up with a new model for game releases as historical RPGs, each based on one of the original World of Darkness games. This resulted in three new lines: Vampire: The Dark Ages (1996), Werewolf: The Wild West (1997), and Mage: The Sorcerers Crusade (1998).

Reception
Although Mage: The Sorcerers Crusade was among the best selling role-playing games in France in the July–August 1998 period, it and the other most recent World of Darkness games at the time, with the exception of Vampire: The Dark Ages, were commercial failures, contributing to large economic problems for the publisher by 1998. White Wolf decided that they could not afford to keep publishing Mage: The Sorcerers Crusade, Changeling: The Dreaming, and Werewolf: The Wild West, so they were moved to White Wolf's new imprint Arthaus, where they could be produced on smaller budgets; there, Mage: The Sorcerers Crusade was able to succeed commercially.

Reviews
Backstab #9

References

Further reading

External links
 

Mage: The Ascension
Role-playing games introduced in 1998
Dark fantasy role-playing games
Historical role-playing games